UCSD most commonly refers to the University of California, San Diego.

It may also refer to:
Uinta County School District #1
Uinta County School District #4
Uinta County School District #6
Unalaska City School District
Union County School District (Florida)
Union County School District (Georgia)
Union County School District (Mississippi)
Universidad Católica Santo Domingo
Utica City School District